José João Pimenta Costa Mendes (born 24 April 1985 in Guimarães) is a Portuguese cyclist, who rides for UCI Continental team . He is a two-time winner of the Portuguese National Road Race Championships, in 2016 and 2019.

Major results
Source: 

2003
 1st  Time trial, National Junior Road Championships
2005
 2nd Time trial, National Under-23 Road Championships
2008
 9th Overall Tour de Luxembourg
 10th Overall Vuelta a Chihuahua
2009
 3rd Time trial, National Road Championships
 3rd Circuit de Lorraine
2010
 1st Stage 3 Troféu Joaquim Agostinho
 1st Stage 6 Volta a Portugal
2012
 6th Overall Troféu Joaquim Agostinho
2014
 7th Vuelta a Murcia
2015
 3rd Time trial, National Road Championships
 5th Overall Critérium International
 5th Overall Coppa Bernocchi
 6th Overall Giro del Trentino
1st Stage 1 (TTT)
2016
 National Road Championships
1st  Road race
2nd Time trial
 6th Overall Tour of Norway
 7th Overall Tour of Slovenia
2017
 4th Time trial, National Road Championships
2018
 6th Overall Troféu Joaquim Agostinho
2019
 1st  Road race, National Road Championships

Grand Tour general classification results timeline

References

External links
 Profile - Team Bora Argon 18

1985 births
Living people
Portuguese male cyclists
Cyclists at the 2016 Summer Olympics
Olympic cyclists of Portugal
Sportspeople from Guimarães
Portuguese expatriate sportspeople in the Philippines